This is a list of mayors of Drummondville, Quebec.

List
1898 - 1902: J. William Mitchell
1902 - 1903: J. A. Bousquet
1903 - 1905: Henri Girard
1905 - 1908: Napoléon Garceau
1908 - 1909: David Hébert
1909 - 1912: Napoléon Garceau
1912 - 1914: Ovide Brouillard
1914 - 1918: Alexandre Mercure
1918 - 1920: J. Ovila Montplaisir
1920 - 1924: Napoléon Garceau
1924 - 1936: Walter Moisan
1936 - 1938: Eugène Pelletier
1938 - 1942: Arthur Rajotte
1942 - 1948: Joseph Garon
1948 - 1950: Gaston Ringuet
1950 - 1954: Antoine Biron
1954 - 1955: Jean B. Michaud
1955 - 1966: Marcel Marier
1966 - 1983: Philippe Bernier
1983 - 1987: Serge Ménard
1987 - 2013: Francine Ruest-Jutras
2013 - 2020: Alexandre Cusson
2020 - 2021: Alain Carrier
2021 - present: Stéphanie Lacoste

Drummondville, Quebec
Mayors of places in Quebec